Canada competed at the 1960 Summer Olympics in Rome, Italy. 85 competitors, 74 men and 11 women, took part in 77 events in 14 sports.

Medalists

Silver
 Donald Arnold, Walter D'Hondt, Nelson Kuhn, John Lecky, Kenneth Loomer, Bill McKerlich, Archibald MacKinnon, Glenn Mervyn, and Sohen Biln – Rowing, men's eight with coxswain

Athletics

Boxing

Canoeing

Cycling

Two cyclists represented Canada in 1960.

Individual road race
 Luigi Bartesaghi
 Alessandro Messina

Diving

Equestrian

Fencing

One fencer represented Canada in 1960.

Men's foil
 Carl Schwende

Gymnastics

Rowing

Canada had 15 male rowers participate in three out of seven rowing events in 1960.

 Men's coxless pair
 Lorne Loomer
 Keith Donald

 Men's coxless four
 Robert Adams
 Clayton Brown
 Chris Leach
 Franklin Zielski

 Men's eight
 Donald Arnold
 Walter D'Hondt
 Nelson Kuhn
 John Lecky
 David Anderson
 Archibald MacKinnon
 Bill McKerlich
 Glen Mervyn
 Sohen Biln

Sailing

Shooting

Seven shooters represented Canada in 1960.

25 m pistol
 Garfield McMahon
 Godfrey Brunner

50 m pistol
 Garfield McMahon
 Godfrey Brunner

300 m rifle, three positions
 Edson Warner
 Evald Gering

50 m rifle, three positions
 Evald Gering
 Gil Boa

50 m rifle, prone
 Gil Boa
 Edson Warner

Trap
 Gilbert Henderson
 William Jones

Swimming

Weightlifting

Wrestling

References

Nations at the 1960 Summer Olympics
1960
Summer Olympics